The Iraq Alliance (Etelaf Al-Iraq), (list 262) is an Iraqi political coalition formed for the 2014 Iraqi parliamentary election by various liberal and pro-business figures.

References

External links
Iraq Alliance official website

2013 establishments in Iraq
Electoral lists for Iraqi elections
Liberal parties in Iraq
Political parties established in 2013